LaSalle Lake State Fish and Wildlife Area is an Illinois state park on  in LaSalle County, Illinois, United States. It is a man-made lake, built as a cooling pond for the LaSalle County Generating Station.

References

State parks of Illinois
Protected areas of LaSalle County, Illinois
Cooling ponds